Cocaine Coast is a Spanish crime drama television series created by Bambú Producciones for Atresmedia. The series is based on Nacho Carretero's nonfiction book Fariña (Flour, slang for cocaine in Galician). It premiered on Antena 3 on 28 February 2018. The series stars Javier Rey as Sito Miñanco, an infamous Galician drug trafficker. On 3 August 2018, the series premiered internationally on Netflix as Cocaine Coast.

Premise
Sito Miñanco, a fisherman who is skilled in speedboat handling, starts to work in a tobacco smuggling ring led by Vicente Otero Pérez "Terito", the head of the Galician clans of the Ría de Arousa. Miñanco then starts his own ring alongside two friends. The different clans consider starting to traffic hashish, but Terito is against smuggling illegal drugs. Later, on a trip to Panama to launder money, Sito contacts traffickers who want to introduce cocaine into Europe through Galicia.

Cast

Main cast

Recurring cast

Episodes

See also
 Operation Necora

References

External links
 
 

2010s crime drama television series
2018 Spanish television series debuts
2018 Spanish television series endings
Antena 3 (Spanish TV channel) network series
Crime thriller television series
Spanish crime television series
Spanish-language television shows
Television series about illegal drug trade
Television series about organized crime
Television shows set in Galicia (Spain)
Television series set in the 1980s
Television series set in the 1990s
Works about organized crime in Spain
2010s Spanish drama television series
Television series by Bambú Producciones